Ividia is a genus of sea snails, marine gastropod mollusks, in the family Pyramidellidae.

Species
Species within the genus Ividia include:

References

 Landau B.M. & LaFollette P.I. (2015). The Pyramidellidae (Mollusca: Gastropoda) from the Miocene Cantaure Formation of Venezuela. Cainozoic Research. 15(1-2): 13-54
 Robba E. (2013) Tertiary and Quaternary fossil pyramidelloidean gastropods of Indonesia. Scripta Geologica 144: 1-191. [April 2013]
note: treated as synonym of Miralda 

Pyramidellidae
Gastropod genera